Radosavska is a village in the municipality of Banja Luka, Republika Srpska, Bosnia and Herzegovina.

References

Villages in Republika Srpska
Populated places in Banja Luka